Veronica Perrule Dobson  (born 1944) is an Eastern Arrernte linguist, educator, elder, Traditional Owner, author and ecologist. She is instrumental in establishing Eastern Arrernte as a written language.

Early life
Veronica was born at Arltunga, Central Australia, in 1944. She lived on the Arltunga Mission for approximately 10 years.  Her family re-located to Lytentye Apurte (Santa Teresa) mission then she moved to Alice Springs at the age of 16 where she worked in domestic service and in some of the local factories.

Career
Veronica has worked as a translator, interpreter and educator of the Arrernte language and culture for many years. She co-authored Eastern and central Arrernte to English dictionary, to establish Arrernte as a written language and has written educational materials for teaching the language. She was a pioneer in the development of Arrernte language curriculum materials at Yipirinya, an indigenous school in Alice Springs.

Veronica is a botanist and ecologist drawing on her vast knowledge of Arrernte culture, local plants and their uses. She knows the food and medicines of the Arrernte lands intimately and has co-authored books on botany and worked with scientists on projects about plants, water quality, bush fire management, Arrente concepts of relatedness, the Native Seed Bank, and has contributed to a number of reports and papers on indigenous ecology. She has worked with staff of Central Land Council, NT Parks and Wildlife and CSIRO. She helped establish the bush medicine garden at the Olive Pink Botanic Garden and the Alice Springs Desert Park in central Australia.  She served on The Merne Altyerre-ipenhe (Food from the Creation Time) Reference Group advising on  ethical guidelines for the bush foods industry in central Australia. She also was a senior advisor on the Indigemoji app launched in 2019.

She has been awarded for her community service as a teacher and research collaborator. She often shares her natural history knowledge with the public.

Works
 
 
 
 
 
 
 
 
 
 

Dobson, Veronica; Turner, MK; Woods, Gail; Turpin, Myfany (2009) Thipele arle ileme akerte. Things that birds let you know about, posters

Awards
 2011 Member of the Order of Australia for her services to the Indigenous Community as an Arrernte elder and traditional owner, as a linguist, naturalist and ecologist, and for the preservation of Aboriginal language and culture in Central Australia.
 2011 Northern Territory Research and Innovation Award co-recipient of Desert Knowledge Award with Myra Ah Chee, M Kemarre Turner, Lorna Wilson, Rayleen Brown, Bess Price, Gina Smith, Maree Meredith, Josie Douglas and Fiona Walsh
 2013 Companion of the Charles Darwin University
 2015 NAIDOC Female Elder of the Year
2020 Honoree, Webby Awards for Indigemoji
2020 Honorary Mention, Prix Ars Electronica for Indigemoji
2020 Best Digital Product, First Nations Media Awards for Indigemoji

References

1944 births
Members of the Order of Australia
Indigenous Australian linguists
Women linguists
Arrernte elders
Living people
Ethnobiologists
Australian translators
21st-century translators
Linguists of Arandic languages